for winners of the trotting event see: Inter Dominion Trotting Championship
The Inter Dominion is a harness racing competition that has been contested since 1936 in Australia and New Zealand.

The Inter Dominion was the brain child of Western Australian Trotting Association Chairman Mr. J P Stratton, with the first series held at Gloucester Park, Perth.

The host of the series is rotated between the six harness racing states of Australia and the North and South Islands of New Zealand. The rotation of the Championships is fixed annually at a meeting of the council. It is fixed five years in advance. It is held in New Zealand once in each four years.

The traditional format is a series of heats held over a two-week period, with the final held in a third. Competitors earn points based on their finishing order in each heat, the 14 horses that accrue the most points over the series go into the Grand Final.

The winner is determined by the finishing order in the Grand Final. There is also a Consolation race.

The scheduling of the distances is usually at the discretion of the host club. The usual distance is a longer distance in excess of 2400 metres.

Blacks A Fake made history in 2010, by becoming the only horse to win four Inter Dominion races.

Pacing championship winners

Notes:

 In 1971 Juniors Image was first past the post but was disqualified for a positive swab test.
 In 2011 Smoken Up was first past the post but was disqualified for a positive drugs test. A court challenge to the disqualification was not successful.
 In 2021 Expensive Ego was first past the post, however was relegated to second placing after causing interference to runner-up Boncel Benjamin.

2022 Inter Dominion (Victoria)

The 2022 Inter Dominion started on 26 November 2022 at Ballarat with 3 heats each for pacers and trotters, all run over 2200m. The second night, Tuesday 29 November, is at Shepparton and the heats are 1690m.  The third night, 3 December, is at Geelong and the races are 2570m. On 10 December the finals are held at Melton and each race is run over 2760m.

The points awarded during the heats are: 1st (16 points), 2nd (13), 3rd (11), 4th (9), 5th (8), 6th (7), 7th (6), 8th (5), 9th (4), 10th (3), 11th (2) and 12th (1).

The stake for the Pacing heats was $30,000 while the Consolation race is $50,000 and the Grand Final $500,000.

2021 Inter Dominion (New South Wales) 

There was no Inter Dominion in 2020.  The 2021 Inter Dominions were held from Saturday 27 November 2021 to 11 December 2021.  The first round of heats and the finals were held at Menangle Park Paceway while the second and third rounds of heats were at Bathurst and Newcastle respectively.

Due to COVID-19 a significant number of horses, particularly from New Zealand, were unable to compete.

Horses that were in the final rankings but did not compete included:
 5 - Father Bob - Mark Fletcher, NSW 
 7 - Ride High - Clayton Tonkin, Vic
 9 - Out To Play - Emma Stewart, Vic 
 14 - San Carlo - S J Donoghue & R K Bartley, Vic 
 16 - Code Bailey NZ - Margaret Lee, Vic 
 19 - Colt Thirty One - Grant Dixon, Qld 
 25 - Zeuss Bromac NZ - Paul Fiztpatrick, NSW 
 30 - Perfect Stride NZ - Russell Jack, Vic 
 31 - Jilliby Chevy - Margaret Lee, Vic 
 33 - Mister Brazil - Adam Ruggari, NSW 
 34 - Blacksadance - Chantal Turpin, Qld

2019 Inter Dominion (Auckland) 

The 2019 Inter Dominions were held in Auckland, New Zealand, hosted by the Auckland Trotting Club at the Alexandra Park track from Friday 29 November 2019 to 15 December 2019.
 
Spankem who was one of the favourite contenders for the Interdoms was withdrawn due to a fetlock injury diagnosed following Christchurch cupweek.

Heats 1 and 2 on Friday 29 November were raced over 2200m with a mobile start and Free-for-all conditions.

 Heat 1 was won by Ultimate Sniper (Natalie Rasmussen, $2.50) from Chase Auckland (Tim Williams) and Mach Shard (Zachary Butcher) in 2:35.4 (mile rate 1:53.6).
 Heat 2 was carried out by A G's White Socks (Maurice McKendry MNZM, $29.60) from Cruz Bromac (Mark Purdon) and Thefixer (Natalie Rasmussen) in 2:36.1 (mile rate 1:54.2).

Heat 3 and 4 on Tuesday 3 December were raced over 1700m.

 Heat 3 was won by A G's White Socks (Maurice McKendry, $6.40) from Chase Auckland (Tim Williams) and My Kiwi Mate (Craig Demmler) in 1:59.17 (mile rate 1:52.7).
 Heat 4 was won by Ultimate Sniper (Natalie Rasmussen, $2.80) from Cruz Bromac (Mark Purdon) and Mach Shard (Zac Butcher) in 1:59.01 (mile rate 1:52.6).

Heat 5 and 6 on Friday 6 December were raced over 2700m.

 Heat 5 was won by Ultimate Sniper (Natalie Rasmussen, $1.50) from Chase Auckland (Tim Williams) and Colt Thirty One (Grant Dixon) in 3:16.11 (mile rate 1:56.8).
 Heat 6 was won by Cruz Bromac (Mark Purdon, $2.70) from Thefixer (Natalie Rasmussen) and Triple Eight (David Butcher) in 3:16.7 (mile rate 1:57.2).

The Grand final (2700m) was raced on 14 December and won by Ultimate Sniper (Natalie Rasmussen) in 3:14.7 (1:56.0) from Mach Shard (Zac Butcher) and Thefixer (Blair Orange). The 4 year old Ultimate Sniper went through the series undefeated.

The horse Triple Eight was number 8 in the final, drawn 8 and was placed 8th.

1952 Inter-Dominion racebook

See also

 Harness racing in Australia
 Harness racing in New Zealand

Reference list

External links
 2009 Watpac Inter Dominion Official Site
 Rotation Program - Inter Dominion Championship Series
 Queensland Harness Racing Homepage - Host state for 2009 Inter Dominion

Recurring sporting events established in 1936
Harness races in Australia
Australasian Grand Circuit Races
Inter Dominion winners
Inter Dominion